Pablo Pablo Cuneta Sr. (February 2, 1910 – September 27, 2000) was a Filipino politician who served as the Mayor of Pasay for three terms between 1951 and 1998, making him the longest-serving mayor in the history of the Philippines. He was the father of actress and singer Sharon Cuneta.

Early life
Cuneta was born on February 2, 1910, in Pasay (then a municipality of Rizal) to Catalino Cuneta y García (c. 1871 – c. 1948) and Miguela Pablo y de la Cruz (c. 1873 – October 15, 1948).

Personal life
He was first married to Generosa Francisco until her death in 1992. They had ten children: Edgardo, Reynaldo, Leonides, Rosauro, Leticia, Jaime, Carmencita, Pablo Jr., Generoso, and Aida.

After Generosa’s death, he married Elinor "Elaine" Gamboa in 1993 until his death in 2000 and married for 37 years. Together, they had two children: César "Chet" and Sharon.

Political career
Cuneta started his political career when he served as deputy governor of Rizal from 1947 to 1949. In 1951, he was appointed Pasay mayor. 5 years later, he ran for mayor and won. He ran again and won, in the 1959 and 1963 elections. In 1967, he was defeated by Jovito Claudio. He bounced back in the 1971 National Elections and was re-elected again in 1980. He stepped down when the Aquino government was swept into power in 1986. 2 years later, he again won in the local elections. He would top the local elections again in 1992 and 1995. At the end of his term in 1998, he had been Pasay mayor for 41 years, the longest-serving mayor in Philippine history. He is the only mayor to have served under 7 different Presidents: Elpidio Quirino, Ramon Magsaysay, Carlos P. Garcia, Diosdado Macapagal, Ferdinand Marcos, Corazon Aquino and Fidel Ramos.

Health and death
His family claims he was in good health until December 1996 when rheumatism and arthritis ravaged his body. In mid-1997, he suffered a mild seizure and was confined at the Makati Medical Center and died due to cardiac arrest on September 27, 2000, at the age of 90. He was the longest-serving mayor in Philippine history. His remains lie at the Manila Memorial Park in Parañaque.

Legacy
Cuneta's administration is credited for the construction of the Maricaban Settlement, Pamantasan ng Lungsod ng Pasay, Pasay City General Hospital and the Cuneta Astrodome, among other projects.

Notes

References

1910 births
2000 deaths
People from Pasay
Liberal Party (Philippines) politicians
Mayors of Pasay
Burials at the Manila Memorial Park – Sucat
Nacionalista Party politicians
Kilusang Bagong Lipunan politicians